The Richard J. Codey Arena at South Mountain (formerly the South Mountain Arena) is an ice hockey and ice skating arena in West Orange, New Jersey as part of the South Mountain Recreation Complex.  The arena is named for former Governor of New Jersey Richard Codey.  The Codey Arena is owned and operated by the Essex County Department of Park, Recreation, and Cultural Affairs.

History

South Mountain Arena originally opened in 1958 with the second, smaller rink added in 1983. During 2004 and 2005 the arena underwent major renovations that included a new state-of-the-art lobby for the arena including meeting rooms, a skylight, automatic doors, pro shop (now a glice training area), arcade, and concession stand. Another part of the renovation was a new set of dasher boards, Plexiglas, compression system, jumbotron screen, and seats for Rink 1, as well as a new dehumidifier for Rink 2; it was renamed the Codey Arena upon reopening. In 2017, management announced that Rink 1 would undergo renovation once again putting in new seats, new boards, and a new jumbotron/scoreboard. In the fall of 2018, the arcade was replaced by vending machines.

Hockey
The arena has two NHL-sized skating rinks. The main arena has a seating capacity of 2,500 and the second rink seats approximately 500. From 1986 until the opening of the Prudential Center (which includes a full-size practice rink) in 2007, the New Jersey Devils used the arena as the team's practice facility. In November 2008 it became home to the Jersey Rockhoppers of the Eastern Professional Hockey League. The arena is also home to the New Jersey Daredevils, a special needs hockey team that has practices and home games at the arena since 2002. The Daredevils play in the (ASHA) American Special Hockey Association League. Since 2009, The Daredevils host an annual Halloween hockey tournament in October for all Special Hockey International Teams (including the Daredevils) called Frankenfest. The New Jersey Devils Youth Hockey club is also based at the arena with more than twenty teams from the beginners entry level to the highly competitive AAA USA Hockey Sanctioned level. The Seton Hall University and the Seton Hall Preparatory School men's hockey teams also compete at the arena. Livingston High School hockey also plays at the arena. They are known as The Lancers.

Ice skating
The arena offers many classes at different levels from toddlers to adults. There are also public sessions available during weekdays and weekends.

Essex Skating Club

The Essex Skating Club (ESC) is the figure skating club at the arena. The club has more than 300 youth and adult members with winning records at national competitions. A number of coaches at ESC are Worlds and Olympic medalists such as Kay Barsdell, Oleg Bliakhman, Ken Foster and JoJo Starbuck. The Synchroettes are youth synchronized skating teams with winning records including regional champions and the gold medal at the 2010 U.S. Synchronized Skating Championships. In 2012, the Junior-level team of Synchroettes was selected by the U.S. Figure Skating to be part of the Team USA for 2012–13 season to compete in Leon Lurje Trophy international competition in Sweden. The Essex Blades is an adult synchronized skating team which ranked 6th at the 2011 U.S. Synchronized Skating Championships. Bravo! is a Novice Theatre on Ice team which ranked 4th at the 2011 US National Theatre on Ice Competition. In 2012, Bravo! was selected by US Figure Skating to be one of the two Novice teams to represent the United States at the 2013 Nations Cup in Spain.

Garden State Speedskating
The Garden State Speedskating is one of 70 speed skating clubs and the only club in New Jersey sanctioned by US Speedskating. The Garden State Speedskating has two home rinks. The home rink at Richard J. Codey Arena offers Learn to Speed Skating program for all skating levels.

Other usage
The arena has been used in non-ice sport tournaments such as Essex County Tournament of high school wrestling, and other events such as graduation ceremonies. The arena is also a site of emergency shelters for the county in the time of natural disasters. Occasionally, a rink is rented out for private entities, for instance, using it as a filming location for a Super Bowl commercial.

The arena was also home to the New Jersey Gems of the Women's Professional Basketball League during the Gem's third and final season of play in 1980–81.

Public transportation 
New Jersey Transit bus 73 serves the arena, Turtle Back Zoo, and the South Mountain recreational complex. There are two commuter bus lines from the arena to New York City, Community Coach bus 77, and OurBus Livingston/West Orange.

References

External links
 RinkAtlas listing for Richard J. Codey Arena

Sports venues in New Jersey
West Orange, New Jersey
Indoor arenas in New Jersey
Sports venues in Essex County, New Jersey
1958 establishments in New Jersey
Sports venues completed in 1958
Basketball venues in New Jersey
College ice hockey venues in the United States
Figure skating venues in the United States